Boies is both a surname and a given name. Notable people with the name include:

Surname
David Boies (born 1941), lawyer and Chairman of Boies, Schiller & Flexner
Horace Boies (1827–1923), served as Governor of Iowa from 1890 to 1894
Jean-Christophe Boies, Canadian musician
Jean-Sébastien Boies, Canadian musician
Mary Boies, American lawyer and businesswoman
William Dayton Boies (1857–1932), former Republican congressman for Iowa

Given name
Boies Penrose (1860–1921), American lawyer and Republican politician from Philadelphia, Pennsylvania
Jeremiah Smith Boies De Veber (1830–1908), Canadian politician and businessman

See also
Boies, Schiller & Flexner, American law firm founded by David Boies and Jonathan Schiller in 1997
Boie
Boyce (disambiguation)